Kayla Martell (born June 27, 1989) is an American beauty queen from Milford, Delaware and the winner of the Miss Delaware 2010 pageant.  Martell placed in the Top 10 at the Miss America 2011 pageant. In the fifth grade, Martell was diagnosed with alopecia areata and subsequently lost all her hair.  Martell had competed in the Miss Delaware pageant four other times; three times without a wig.  Martell plans to use her platform to raise awareness for alopecia areata.  Martell had previously won Miss Kent County in order to compete in the Miss Delaware competition.  During the state competition, she also won the pageant community service award, the state community service award, and the Thursday evening gown and Friday swimsuit competitions. Martell made it to a semifinalist round in the 2011 Miss America pageant, becoming the first bald contestant in Miss America history.

References

External links

 

Living people
Miss America 2011 delegates
People from Milford, Delaware
American beauty pageant winners
1989 births